Chris Mitchell may refer to:

 Chris Mitchell (journalist), Australian journalist
 Chris Mitchell (Australian footballer) (1947–2022), Australian rules footballer
 Chris Mitchell (Scottish footballer) (1988–2016), Scottish footballer

See also
 Christian Mitchell, Illinois politician
 Christopher Mitchell (disambiguation)